The 44 class are a class of diesel-electric locomotives built by AE Goodwin, Auburn for the New South Wales Department of Railways between 1957 and 1967.

History

The 44 class were built by AE Goodwin, the Australian licensee of US company Alco, and were based on the Alco DL500B model. The locomotives were fitted with Alco 12-251B engines, developing 1343 kW. They were built in two batches, the first 60 between July 1957 and April 1961 and the second 40 between October 1965 and December 1967. The last 40 had Associated Electrical Industries as opposed to General Electric generators and traction motors, as well as illuminated segregated number boxes at the No.2 end. The model was very similar to dual cab South Australian Railways 930 class.

With driving cabs within both ends, the front (No.1 end) of the locomotive had a rounded nose (although not as round as the Clyde/GM "Bulldog nose" type) and a flat nose at the No.2 end. During their career, the locomotives served every part of New South Wales and operated every type of train.

In the late 1980s, some earlier examples in need of rewiring began to be withdrawn, but many survived into the 1990s, with the last being withdrawn in July 1997. Over forty still owned by the State Rail Authority were auctioned off in December 1994.

While most were scrapped, a number saw service with other freight operators. Chicago Freight Car Leasing Australia, Great Northern Rail Services, Independent Rail of Australia, Silverton Rail and Southern Shorthaul Railroad all operated 44s, with most ending up with Qube Logistics until their final withdrawal in 2014.

A number of preserved examples are main-line registered and, as well as operating heritage trains, are used periodically by other operators.

Three are on Transport Heritage NSW's Heritage and Conservation Register list. 4401 was in the custody of 3801 Limited, and 4403 was with the Australian Railway Historical Society, Canberra until 2017. 4401 is now in the custody of the Junee Roundhouse Railway Museum, and 4403 and 4490 are with the NSW Rail Museum.

Fleet status

References

Further reading

External links

A. E. Goodwin locomotives
Co-Co locomotives
Diesel locomotives of New South Wales
Railway locomotives introduced in 1957
Standard gauge locomotives of Australia
Diesel-electric locomotives of Australia
Streamlined diesel locomotives